The year 589 BC was a year of the pre-Julian Roman calendar. In the Roman Empire, it was known as year 165 Ab urbe condita . The denomination 589 BC for this year has been used since the early medieval period, when the Anno Domini calendar era became the prevalent method in Europe for naming years.

Events
 Apries succeeds his father Psamtik II as king of Egypt.
 Nebuchadnezzar begins his siege of Jerusalem.

Births

Deaths
 Psamtik II, king of Egypt

References